Sourouklis Troullon was a Cypriot football club based in Troulloi, Larnaca. The team was playing sometimes in Cypriot Third Division and in Cypriot Fourth Division. In 2015 were merged with Dafni Troulloi to form Troulloi FC 2015.

References

Football clubs in Cyprus
1972 establishments in Cyprus
Association football clubs disestablished in 2015
Association football clubs established in 1972
2015 disestablishments in Cyprus